Yeşim is a feminine Turkish given name and means "jade" in Turkish language. Notable people with the name include:
 Dilan Yeşim Taşkın (born 2001), Turkish-Austrian footballer
 Yeşim Ağaoğlu (born 1966), Turkish multidisciplinary artist and poet
 Yeşim Bostan (born 1995), Turkish archer
 Yeşim Büber (born 1977), Turkish actress
 Yeşim Demirel (born 1990), Turkish-German footballer
 Yeşim Salkım (born 1968), Turkish singer and actress
 Yeşim Ustaoğlu (born 1960), Turkish filmmaker and screenwriter
 Yeşim Tozan (born 1975), Turkish actress

Turkish feminine given names